New York's 83rd State Assembly district is one of the 150 districts in the New York State Assembly. It has been represented by Assembly Speaker Carl Heastie since 2001.

Geography
District 83 is in The Bronx. It contains the neighborhoods of Williamsbridge, Wakefield, Edenwald, Eastchester, and Baychester.

Recent election results

2022

2020

2018

2016

2014

2012

2010

References

83